The Pilgrim Jubilees, also known as The Pilgrim Jubilee Singers, are an American traditional black gospel music group originally from the cities of Jackson, Mississippi and Chicago, Illinois, where they were established by Elgie Graham and Willie Johnson, in 1934. The group have released 25 albums with six record labels Nashboro Records, Peacock Records, Savoy Records, Malaco Records, MCA Records, and Benson Records. Five of those albums charted on the Billboard magazine charts.

Background
The Mississippi and Illinois-based traditional black gospel group, The Pilgrim Jubilees, were established in 1934 by Elgie Graham and Willie Johnson, as a duo at that time in Houston, Mississippi. They added three more members to the duo in 1946: Elgie's brother Theophilles Graham, Monroe Hatchett, and Leonard Brownlee. The Graham family settled in Chicago, Illinois, in 1950, where they added Major Roberson, Kenneth Madden and two more of Elgie's brothers, Cleve and Clay Graham, alongside Richard "Rufus" Crume, Percy Clark, and Roosevelt English. Elgie left the group in 1955, so he could retire and do other ministry. Madden and Crume also left the group during the 1960s, while they added Bobby McDougal in the late 1960s, and Ben Chandler and Michael Atkins in the early 1970s. They gained two more members during the 1990s: Eddie Graham, a cousin, and Fred Price.

The group is currently Cleve and Clay Graham, Bobby McDougal, Ben Chandler, Michael Atkins, Eddie Graham and Fred Price.

History
The group has released 25 albums with six labels from 1952 to the present day. Those labels were Nashboro Records, Peacock Records, Savoy Records, Malaco Records, MCA Records, and Benson Records.

Their first recording contract was with Nashboro Records, where they made singles, and this gained them enough revenue to be an operable band, while they were originating out of two barbershops owned by Cleve and Clay.

Dave Clark heard the group in Atlanta, Georgia during the late 1950s, while he was a disc jockey for Peacock Records, the first label to release an album by the group, after they signed them in 1961.

Their first studio album, Walk Out, released in 1961, sold more than 100,000 copies. Soon thereafter, Rufus Crume left the group, becoming a member in The Soul Stirrers.

They released 24 more albums, with five of those charting on the Billboard magazine Gospel Albums chart: Gospel Roots at No. 19, Back to Basics at No. 28, Family Affair at No. 18, I'm Getting Better All the Time at No. 37, and In Revival at No. 31.

Members
Current
 Cleve Graham
 Clay Graham
 Bobby McDougal
 Ben Chandler
 Michael Atkins
 Eddie Graham
 Fred Price
Former
 Elgie Graham (co-founder)
 Willie Johnson (co-founder)
 Theophilles Graham
 Monroe Hatchett
 Leonard Brownlee
 Major Roberson
 Kenneth Madden
 Richard "Rufus" Crume
 Percy Clark
 Roosevelt English
 Castro Coleman

Discography

References

External links
 Cross Rhythms profile

Musical groups established in 1934
1934 establishments in the United States